The Miniconjou (Lakota: Mnikowoju, Hokwoju – ‘Plants by the Water’) are a Native American people constituting a subdivision of the Lakota people, who formerly inhabited an area in western present-day South Dakota from the Black Hills in to the Platte River.  The contemporary population lives mostly in west-central South Dakota. Perhaps the most famous Miniconjou chief was Touch the Clouds.

Historic Miniconjou thiyóšpaye or bands 
Together with the Sans Arc (Itázipčho, Itazipcola, Hazipco - ‘Those who hunt without bows’) and Two Kettles (Oóhe Núŋpa, Oóhenuŋpa, Oohenonpa - ‘Two Boiling’ or ‘Two Kettles’) they were often referred to as Central Lakota and divided into several bands or thiyóšpaye:

 Unkche yuta (‘Dung Eaters’)
 Glaglaheca (‘Untidy’, ‘Slovenly’, ‘Shiftless’)
 Shunka Yute Shni (‘Eat No Dogs’, split off from the Wanhin Wega)
 Nige Tanka (‘Big Belly’)
 Wakpokinyan (‘Flies Along the River’)
 Inyan ha oin (‘Musselshell Earring’)
 Siksicela or Shikshichela (‘Bad Ones’, ‘Bad ones of different kinds’)
 Wagleza-oin (‘Gartersnake Earring’)
 Wanhin Wega (‘Broken Arrow’, the Shunka Yute Shni and Oóhenuŋpa split off about 1840)
 Tall Bear

The Oóhenuŋpa or Two Kettles were first part of the Miniconjou thiyóšpaye called Wanhin Wega, split off about 1840 and became a separate oyate or tribe.

Miniconjou leaders 
Joseph White Bull (Ptesan Hunka) explained that prior to being confined to the reservation in the late 19th century, the Miniconjou recognized six hereditary leaders within their tribe, who were chosen from each clan. These men were:
 Makes Room
 Black Shield
 Lone Horn of a Minneconjou band called the Wakpokinyan (Flies Along the Stream)
 White Hollow Horn
 White Swan
 Comes Flying

These men became renowned war chiefs among the Miniconjou, rising through the ranks of the men's warrior societies. "They were treated as chiefs because of this," White Bull explained, "They wore shirts decorated with scalps." He identified these two leaders as:
 Lame Deer
 Black Moon

Other notable Miniconjou:

 Hump or High Backbone
 White Bull, son of Makes Room
 Big Crow, son of Black Shield
 Touch the Clouds, son of Lone Horn
 Little Bear, son of White Hollow Horn
 White Swan, son of White Swan
 Comes Flying
 Crazy Heart, son of Lame Deer
 Spotted Elk, son of Lone Horn, half-brother of Touches the Clouds
 Chief Spotted Elk, later known as "Chief Big Foot"
 Dewey Beard
 Kicking Bear

See also

 Red Horse (Lakota chief)

References

External links
Indian genealogy
Rosebud Sioux

 
Great Sioux War of 1876